Vermilion-Lloydminster-Wainwright is a provincial electoral district in Alberta, Canada. The district is one of 87 districts mandated to return a single member (MLA) to the Legislative Assembly of Alberta using the first-past-the-post method of voting. It was contested for the first time in the 2019 Alberta election.

Geography
The district is coterminous with the municipal districts of Wainwright and Vermilion River in eastern Alberta. It is named for its three largest communities, Vermilion, Lloydminster, and Wainwright. Major thoroughfares include Highway 14, the Yellowhead Highway, the interprovincial Highway 17, and Highway 41.

History

The district was created in 2017 when the Electoral Boundaries Commission recommended renaming Vermilion-Lloydminster, transferring its portion of Minburn County to Fort Saskatchewan-Vegreville and absorbing the MD of Wainwright from Battle River-Wainwright. Although the Commission recommended the name Vermilion-Wainwright for this district, the Legislative Assembly decided to retain Lloydminster in the name at the request of Vermilion-Lloydminster MLA Richard Starke.

Electoral results

2010s

References

Alberta provincial electoral districts
Lloydminster
2017 establishments in Alberta